Madeleine Bayon (born 4 December 1997) is a French female acrobatic gymnast. With partners Alizée Costes and Noémie Nadaud, Bayon achieved 7th at the 2014 Acrobatic Gymnastics World Championships.

References

1997 births
Living people
French acrobatic gymnasts
Female acrobatic gymnasts
21st-century French women